Anna Andreevna Dodonova (1888-1967) was a Bolshevik activist and intellectual. She participated in the Bolshevik Revolution as a member of the Moscow  Military Revolutionary Committee. Following the seizure of power she participated in the cultural division of the Moscow Soviet, serving as the head of the culture department. She was a member of the governing Presidium of Proletkult from its establishment in 1918 until disbandment in 1932.

She was married to Valerian Pletnev and helped him implement Lenin's plan to subordinate Proletkult  as being entirely subordinate to the People's Commissariat for Education (Narkompros), which would in turn be subordinate to the Communist Party.

Dodonova died in 1967 and was buried at the Novodevichy Cemetery.

Reference

1888 births
1967 deaths
Old Bolsheviks
Russian Social Democratic Labour Party members
Burials at Novodevichy Cemetery